Nigel Leigh Brookes (born 12 December 1967) is a former Australian cricketer.  Brookes was a right-handed batsman who bowled right-arm fast-medium.  He was born at Nowra, New South Wales.

Brookes played a single List A match for Tasmania against England A in February 1993. He wasn't required to bat in this match, while with the ball he bowled 9 wicket-less overs, with Tasmania winning by 24 runs. He made no further appearances for Tasmania.

See also
 List of Tasmanian representative cricketers

References

External links
Nigel Brookes at ESPNcricinfo
Nigel Brookes at CricketArchive

1967 births
Living people
People from Nowra
Australian cricketers
Tasmania cricketers
Cricketers from New South Wales